Walden School may refer to one of several educational institutions:

 The Walden School Hyderabad (formerly known as The Magnet School), an independent K-12 Jiddu Krishnamurti school in Hyderabad, India
 Walden School (Saffron Walden) (formerly known as Friends' School), a Quaker independent school located in Saffron Walden, Essex
 The Walden School, a private summer music camp in Dublin, New Hampshire
 The Walden School (Media, Pennsylvania), a member of the Association of Delaware Valley Independent Schools
 Walden School (Altadena, California), a private school in Pasadena, California
 Walden School (Louisville), a private school in Louisville, Kentucky
 Walden School (New York City), a defunct private day school in Manhattan
 Walden School (Vermont), a public school in Walden, Vermont
 Walden School, a school at The Learning Center for the Deaf, Framingham, Massachusetts
 Walden Elementary School in Orange County, New York
 Walden III Middle/High School, an alternative school in Racine, Wisconsin
 Walden Middle School (Kansas City) a public school in Kansas City, Missouri

See also 
 Walden (disambiguation)